The 19th annual International Emmy Awards took place on November 25, 1991 in New York City. The award ceremony was hosted by Roger Moore and presented by the International Academy of Television Arts and Sciences (IATAS). A&E TV network aired the awards on December 28 to more than 20 countries including Italy, Germany, Australia, Spain, Japan and China.

Judgment 
This year's entries – 242 from 24 nations – were judged in New York City and Los Angeles by U.S.-based TV executives, distributors, buyers, producers, writers and directors. To ensure that programs are not judged on production values alone, judges are instructed to consider the concept behind a show as well as the execution.

Ceremony 
International Emmy nominees were announced by the International Academy of Television Arts and Sciences (IATAS) on November 10, 1991. A total of 18 TV shows were selected to compete for awards in six categories, 14 of which are in English language, including all nominated in the categories of documentary arts, popular arts program and children's program. The United Kingdom accounted for 10 of the 18 nominations. Three Australian programs were nominated, followed by Canada with two nominations, and France, Spain and Germany with one each. In addition to the programming awards, the International Academy honored Henry P. Becton Jr., President and General Manager of the WGBH Foundation, with the Directorate Award and documentary filmmaker Adrian Cowell, with the Founders Award. The award ceremony was produced by Joseph Cates, and broadcast by the Italian web site RAI.

Winners

References 

International Emmy Awards ceremonies
International
International